Mount Mann is a mountain,  high, standing on the southeast edge of Lexington Table,  south of Mount Zirzow, in the Forrestal Range, Pensacola Mountains, Antarctica. It was mapped by the United States Geological Survey from surveys and U.S. Navy air photos from 1956 to 1966, and was named by the Advisory Committee on Antarctic Names for Captain Edward K. Mann of the United States Air Force, who was an assistant in the Research Division of the U.S. Naval Support Force, Antarctica between 1966 and 1968.

References

Mountains of Queen Elizabeth Land
Pensacola Mountains
Mountains of Antarctica